The Rely H series including the Rely H3, Rely H5, and Rely H6 is a series of light commercial van produced by the Chinese automobile manufacturer Chery under the Wanda (万达) branch and branded under the Rely (威麟) brand, a premium marque launched by Chery in 2009. First launched in 2010, the Rely H series has since been available in a wide range of body configurations, including a minivan/MPV, minibus, panel van, crew van, and an ambulance.

Overview

The Rely H5 was released by Chery Auto on March 26, 2010, with deliveries of the Rely H3 models starting on November 3, 2010. No upgrades had been made for both the H3 and H5 models after the 2010 release. Due to low demand, Chery stopped producing the H3 in 2013, although leftover stocks are still available at some dealerships as of early 2014.

The Rely H3 provides up to 12 seating positions, compared with 14 seats on the Rely H5. The Rely H3 and Rely H5 share all essential body parts as well as styling features with only the size being different.

Power of the Rely H3 and H5 comes from a turbo-charged 2.0 liter engine mated to a 5-speed manual transmission.

An slightly updated and larger model called the H6 was offered up till 2018 with engine options including a 2.7 liter turbo inline-four gasoline engine and a 2.8 liter turbo diesel inline-four engine.

Controversies
The designs of the Rely H3 and Rely H5 are controversial as they heavily resemble the fifth generation Toyota HiAce (H200) with similar body styles and overall vehicle dimensions. The Rely H3 and Rely H5 are among the various Chinese vans from domestic brands that chose to replicate the Toyota HiAce H200 vans with only minor styling differences. Other brands include government owned manufacturers including Jinbei and Foton.

References

External links 

  (China)

Rely H3|Rely H5|Rely H6
Cars of China
Minibuses
Cab over vehicles
Vans
Cars introduced in 2010
2010s cars